Tsui Siu-ming (born 1953) is a Hong Kong-based actor, screenwriter, film producer, assistant director, production manager, and action choreographer.

Career
A native of Guangdong, Tsui was once a recognized child star. He had tried his hands in singing during the 1970s and 1980s with such tunes as "The New Chameleon" (新變色龍), "Za Xiang Hu Shan Xing" (再向虎山行) and "Huei Sheng Gu Li Nian Li Qing" (回聲谷裡念離情).

He also produced drama serials for Rediffusion Television (RTV) such as the rating-topper "Chameleon". Tsui worked for ATV in 1998 and became CEO of Emperor Motion Pictures in the subsequent year where he was responsible for film and TV business development. 

In March 2005, he founded Sundream Motion Pictures, a subsidiary of pay TV provider  I-CABLE Communications Ltd., producing films such as Twins Mission and Eye in the Sky.

References

External links

Tsui Siu-ming biography at the Hong Kong Movie Database
 HK cinemagic entry

1953 births
Hong Kong male child actors
Hong Kong film producers
Hong Kong screenwriters
Living people
Members of the Election Committee of Hong Kong, 2007–2012
Members of the Election Committee of Hong Kong, 2012–2017